Dietmar Klinger (born 8 January 1958) is a retired German football player.

Honours
 DFB-Pokal winner: 1984–85

References

External links
 

1958 births
Living people
German footballers
Schwarz-Weiß Essen players
Rot-Weiss Essen players
KFC Uerdingen 05 players
Wuppertaler SV players
Bundesliga players
2. Bundesliga players
Association football midfielders
Footballers from Essen
20th-century German people